is one of five wards of Sendai, the largest city in the Tōhoku region of Japan.  Aoba-ku encompasses 302.278 km² and had a population of 296,551, with 147,622 households as of March 1, 2012.

Infrastructure
The Miyagi Prefecture government office and the main city government offices are located there, along with JR Sendai Station, a busy train station that houses and is surrounded by stores of all kind. A short walk from the station is the Ichibancho shopping district, a popular destination. The outdoor shopping mall is home to countless shops and restaurants, from McDonald's to kimono stores. Eight stations of the Sendai Subway Nanboku Line are also located in this ward.

Economy

Iris Ohyama has its headquarters in Aoba-ku.

Air China has an office on the 1st floor of the Sendai Honcho Park Building in Aoba-ku. Asiana Airlines operates a sales office in the Taiyoseimei Sendai-eki Kita Building in Aoba-ku.

Tourism
A popular tourist destination in Aoba-ku is Jozenji-Dori, a zelkova-lined street with El Greco sculptures that draws crowds year-round. Photographs of the sculptures are often used for postcards.

The main shrine building (shaden) of the Shinto shrine Ōsaki Hachiman-gū located in Aoba-ku has been designated as National Treasure of Japan.

Education and resources
Sendai International Center is located near the Ichibancho district and the campus of Tohoku University.  The International Center offers information for foreigners in the city, including a library of books in languages other than Japanese (predominantly English).

The South Korean government maintains the Korea Education Institution in Aoba-ku.

Points of interest
 Botanical Garden of Tohoku University

Transport

Railway stations
 JR East
Tōhoku Shinkansen: Sendai
Jōban Line: Sendai
Senseki Line: Aoba-dōri
Senzan Line: Sendai - Tōshōgū - Kita-Sendai - Kitayama - Kunimi - Kuzuoka Station - Rikuzen-Ochiai - Ayashi - Rikuzen-Shirasawa - Kumagane - Nishi-Sendai Hi-Land - Sakunami - Yatsumori - Okunikkawa
Tōhoku Main Line: Sendai
Sendai Subway
Nanboku Line: Asahigaoka - Dainohara - Kita-Sendai - Kita-Yobanchō - Kōtōdai-Kōen - Hirose-dōri - Sendai - Itsutsubashi

Highways
  – (Sendai-Miyagi Interchange)

References

External links

 

Wards of Sendai